£sd (occasionally written Lsd, spoken as "pounds, shillings and pence" or pronounced  ) is the popular name for the pre-decimal currencies once common throughout Europe, especially in the British Isles and hence in several countries of the British Empire and subsequently the Commonwealth. The abbreviation originates from the Latin currency denominations librae, solidi, and denarii. In the United Kingdom, these were referred to as pounds, shillings, and pence (pence being the plural of penny).

Although the names originated from popular coins in the classical Roman Empire, their definitions and the ratios between them were introduced and imposed across Western Europe by the Emperor Charlemagne. The £sd system was the standard across much of the European continent (France, Italy, Germany, etc.) for nearly a thousand years, until the decimalisations of the 18th and 19th centuries.  As the United Kingdom remained one of the few countries retaining it into the 20th century, the system became particularly associated with Britain. It was King Offa of Mercia who adopted the Frankish silver standard of librae, solidi and denarii into Britain in the late 8th century, and the system was used in much of the British Commonwealth until the 1960s and 1970s, with Nigeria being the last to abandon it in the form of the Nigerian pound on 1 January 1973.

Under this system, there were 12 pence in a shilling and 20 shillings, or 240 pence, in a pound. Although the standard ledger accounting system recorded only pounds, shillings and pence, actual minted coins could represent one, several or fractions of these units. The penny was subdivided into 4 farthings until 31 December 1960, when they ceased to be legal tender in the UK, and until 31 July 1969 there were also halfpennies ("ha'pennies") in circulation. The perceived advantage of such a system was its use in some aspects of mental arithmetic, as it afforded many factors and hence fractions of a pound such as tenths, eighths, sixths and even sevenths and ninths if the guinea (worth 21 shillings) was used. When dealing with items in dozens, multiplication and division are straightforward; for example, if a dozen eggs cost four shillings, then each egg was priced at fourpence. Basic addition, however, could be more difficult than using a decimal system.

As countries of the British Empire became independent, some abandoned the £sd system quickly, while others retained it almost as long as the UK itself. The United States of America adopted a decimal system in 1792, 10 years after independence from the British Empire, but retains many other aspects of the customary units for length and weight. Australia, for example, only changed to using a decimal currency on 14 February 1966, 35 years after independence. New Zealand followed suit on 10 July 1967. Still others, notably Ireland, decimalised only when the UK did. The UK abandoned the old penny on Decimal Day, 15 February 1971, when one pound sterling became divided into 100 new pence. This was a change from the system used in the earlier wave of decimalisations in Australia, New Zealand, Rhodesia and South Africa, in which the pound was replaced with a new major currency called either the "dollar" or the "rand". The British shilling was replaced by a 5 new pence coin worth one-twentieth of a pound.

For much of the 20th century, £sd was the monetary system of most of the Commonwealth countries, the major exceptions being Canada and India.

Historically, similar systems based on Roman coinage were used elsewhere; e.g., the division of the livre tournois in France and other pre-decimal currencies such as Spain, which had 20 maravedís to 1 real and 20 reals to 1 duro or 5 pesetas.

Origins

The classical Roman Empire originally used a decimal currency system based on the "as" whereby 1 denarius = 10 as.  The silver denarius was the common circulation coin, but accounting was in sestercii.  Later Roman Emperors undertook multiple coinage reforms, redefining weights and coins' relative values and introducing new coins and new accounting systems for them. Since most reforms were not even completed before the next one began, the late Roman Empire had a veritable mess of multiple overlapping systems of weights and currencies.

Around the 780s, the Frankish emperor Charlemagne cut through the mess by creating a new uniform system. He defined the "libra" as a new measure of weight equivalent to around 489.6 grams (substantially larger than the old Roman pound of 328.9g), and ordered 240 silver units known as denarii to be struck from the new Carolingian pound of pure silver, each denarius containing 22.5 grains of silver. To help accounting, Charlemagne also decreed that the pound was divisible into 20 solidii each of 12 denarii.  Thus began the Carolingian monetary system (1l. = 20s. = 240d.).

The new coinage and accounting system was imposed uniformly across the vast Carolingian Empire and also infiltrated countries on its periphery. In the late 8th century, King Offa of Mercia imported the system into Britain to facilitate transactions (notably "Peter's pence") with the Roman Catholic Church (which used the Carolingian coinage system). But it was not the sole system in Britain – the £sd system would have to compete for a while with the Viking "mark" accounting system, introduced into Danelaw regions. Although £sd ultimately prevailed in Britain, the "mark of account" system lingered on in North Sea trade and areas of Hanseatic influence through much of the Middle Ages.

Charlemagne's new monetary system prevailed across much of Western Europe including France (where the units were known as the livre, sous and denier), Italy (lira, soldo and denaro), the Holy Roman Empire (pfund, schilling and pfennig) and in England (pound, shilling and penny). The English name pound is a Germanic adaptation of the Latin phrase  'a pound weight'. On the Iberian peninsula, the Kingdom of Aragon adopted the Carolingian monetary system (Catalan: lliura, sou and diners), but those of Portugal and Castile (and subsequently Spain) retained the currency system inherited from al-Andalus.

During the early Middle Ages, only the denarius was issued as an actual coin; the libra and solidus were merely units of account. But over time, the silver resources were gradually exhausted and the coins became repeatedly debased by Medieval monarchs, prompting the minting of larger coins from the 13th century. It also led to specification of currencies by mint of origin in contracts and accounting (e.g. a denier parisis, of the Paris mint, contained more actual silver than the very debased denier tournois of the Tours mint).

To facilitate larger transactions, gold coins began to be minted in western Europe around the same time. The French "franc", introduced in 1360, was the first coin anywhere to represent exactly £1 and the gold "sovereign", first minted in 1489, was the first English £1 coin.

Although the £sd system remained intact in ledger accounting, the variety of new coins of various multiples and qualities led to common expression of quantities in terms of number of coins (guineas, crowns, farthings, etc.) But they would all have to be converted into formal £sd units in accounts.

Decimalisation 
The £sd system continued in much of Western Europe for nearly a thousand years, until the "decimalisations" of the 18th and 19th centuries.  The United States of America was among the first to drop the £sd system and adopt a decimal currency in 1792.  In Europe, decimalisation of currency (as well as other weights and measures) began in Revolutionary France with the law of 1795 ("Loi du 18 germinal an III", 7 April 1795), replacing the £sd accounting system of the Ancien régime with a system of 1 franc = 10 decimes = 100 centimes.  Decimalisation was carried by French armies to neighboring European countries during the Napoleonic wars.  By the mid-19th century, most of continental Europe had decimalised, leaving the United Kingdom as the only major country to continue to maintain the £sd system.

Britain considered following the continental example. A parliamentary select committee was set up in 1821 to inquire into decimalisation, but ended up recommending retaining the £sd system.  However, pressure groups were formed inside Britain advocating the adoption of decimalisation of the currency, and Parliament returned to the matter in the 1850s.  Various decimalisation schemes were considered – the Pound-and-Mil scheme, the Farthing scheme, the Half-penny scheme, the Alb scheme, etc. – but all were determined to have deficiencies, and transition would be too difficult and expensive.  The £sd system would be maintained in Britain until 1971.

Decimalisations 

All countries and territories that formerly used the £sd system have now decimalised their currency, with most decimalisations occurring after the Second World War. Malta decimalised its currency in 1972, while Nigeria decimalised in 1973. The British pound sterling and Irish pound were among the last to be decimalised, on 15 February 1971. 

In places where £sd was used, there were several approaches to decimalisation:
The new fractional unit (called the "new penny" in the UK and Ireland and the "cent" in Malta) was worth 2.4 old pence. Malta also created a fractional unit worth  of a pound, called the "mil", worth 0.24 old pence.
This was the approach adopted in South Africa (as the Rand), Australia, New Zealand, Jamaica, Fiji and many other countries.
 A new base unit called the "dollar" was created at parity with the United States dollar. This was done in Canada in 1858 and in many places in the West Indies in the 19th and 20th centuries. In Bermuda in 1970, as the pound was fixed at US$2.40, this made the new Bermudian dollar equal to exactly 100 old pence, with the new cent equal to one old penny.
 Some countries have adopted alternative approaches, such as Ghana, which created a new base unit equal to 100 old pence (not equal to the U.S. dollar), with a fractional unit equal to one old penny, Bahamas, which adopted a new base unit equal to seven shillings, with a fractional unit equal to 0.84 old pence, and The Gambia, which created a new base unit equal to four shillings, with a fractional unit equal to 0.48 old pence.

The following table shows the conversion of common denominations of coins of the £sd systems.

The following coins were not in common circulation in the UK at the time of decimalisation, though the ten shilling note and the pound note were.

The farthing, at  penny, was never converted, as it ceased to be legal tender a decade prior to decimalisation. In 1971, a new penny would have been worth 9.6 farthings (making a farthing slightly more than 0.1 new pence). Similarly, the old halfpenny and the half-crown were not converted in the UK either, having been withdrawn previously.

Pre-decimal coins and banknotes 
United Kingdom pre-decimal banknotes are no longer legal tender, but are exchangeable for their face value (regardless of the possible greater worth if sold or auctioned) if they are taken directly (or posted) to the Bank of England. The last £sd coins to cease being legal tender in the UK after Decimal Day were the sixpence (withdrawn 1980), the shilling (withdrawn 1991) and the florin (withdrawn 1993).  Commemorative crowns minted post decimalisation (worth either 25p or £5) are still legal tender, but are rarely, if ever, spent.

In Australia, pre-decimal coins can still be found in circulation occasionally as 5, 10 and 20-cent coins.

The last £sd banknote to cease to be legal tender anywhere was the Isle of Man ten shilling note, which ceased to be legal tender there in 2013.

Computing

Computers and calculators sold pre-decimalisation – mostly in the 1960s – occasionally came with special support for the £sd system in the form of a fixed-point currency datatype. The IBM 1401 is one such machine; on Sterling models with sd support, it had a switch for selecting between IBM and BSI data layouts of £sd on its auxiliary console (see image). The ICT 1301 and the PL/I language also had £sd support.

Writing conventions and pronunciations

There were several ways to represent amounts of money in writing and speech, with no formal convention; for example:

£2/3/6 (two pounds, three shillings and sixpence), spoken, unless there was cause to be punctilious, "two pound(s), three and six". Whether "pound" or "pounds" was used depended upon the speaker, varying with class, region and context.
1/– (one shilling), colloquially "a bob"; the slash sign derives from the older style of a long s for "solidus", which is also one name for the sign itself; the '–' is used in place of '0', meaning "zero pence").
11d. (elevenpence)
d (a penny halfpenny, three halfpence). As spoken, the lf in halfpenny and halfpence was always silent; they were pronounced "hayp'ny"  and "haypence"  – hence the occasional spellings ha'penny and ha'pence).
3d (three pence), with reference to the above, this became thruppence, commonly referred to as a "threepenny bit".
6d (six pence) known as a "tanner" or half a shilling. 
2/– (two shillings, or one florin, colloquially "two-bob bit")
2/6 (two shillings and six pence, usually said as "two and six" or a "half-crown"; the value could also be spoken as "half a crown", but the coin was always a half-crown)
4/3 ("four and threepence", the latter word pronounced "thruppence" , "threppence" , "throopence" with -oo- as in "foot" , or "four-and-three")
5/– (five shillings, one crown, "five bob", a dollar)
£1/10/– (one pound, ten shillings; one pound ten, "thirty bob")
£1/19/ (one pound, nineteen shillings and elevenpence three farthings: a psychological price, one farthing under £2)
£14/8/2 (fourteen pounds, eight shillings and twopence – pronounced "tuppence"  – in columns of figures. Commonly read "fourteen pound(s) eight and two")

A convention frequently used in retail pricing was to list prices over one pound all in shillings, rather than in pounds and shillings; for example, £4-18-0 would be written as 98/– (£4.90 in decimal currency). This is still seen in shilling categories of Scottish beer, such as 90/– beer.

Sometimes, prices of luxury goods and furniture were expressed by merchants in guineas, although the guinea coin had not been struck since 1799. A guinea was 21 shillings (£1.05 in decimal currency). Professionals such as lawyers and physicians, art dealers, and some others stated their fees in guineas rather than pounds, while, for example, salaries were stated in pounds per annum. Historically, at some auctions, the purchaser would bid and pay in guineas but the seller would receive the same number of pounds; the commission was the same number of shillings. Tattersalls, the main auctioneer of racehorses in the United Kingdom and Ireland, continues this tradition of conducting auctions in guineas at its UK sales (in Ireland, auctions are conducted in euros). The vendor's commission is 5%. The word "guineas" is still found in the names of some British horse races, even though their prize funds are now fixed in pounds – such as the 1,000 Guineas and 2,000 Guineas at Newmarket Racecourse.

Colloquial terms

A farthing or ha'penny bit was called a "mag" (slang for "chattering") because they were originally made from copper and made a ringing noise when dropped. The game of "penny pitching" (bouncing pennies against a wall to see how far they would rebound onto the pavement) was called "mag flying".

A threepenny bit (pronounced thrupney bit) was called a "Joey" (see Fourpence below); it was a silver or silver alloy coin from 1845 to 1937 and a 12-sided bronze coin from 1937 to 1971. It was known as a "tickey" in South Africa and Southern Rhodesia. In Australia it was known as a tray (also spelt trey), or a tray bit, from the French "trois" meaning three.

A fourpenny bit was often known as a "groat", from the medieval four-penny silver coin of the same name. It was nicknamed a "Joey", from Joseph Hume, the Radical MP who championed its reintroduction. When the new threepence coin replaced the fourpence coin in circulation in 1845, it took over its nickname.

A sixpenny bit was a "tanner", derived from the Romany word tano, meaning "small" (because it was smaller than a shilling). It was also called a "tester" or "testoon" from the teston, a French coin. In Australia it was called a "Zack".

One shilling was called a "bob" or "thin 'un" (because it was thinner than a sovereign coin). It is known in Australia as a "deener" possibly from 'Dinar' or 'Denarius'.

A two-shilling piece known as a florin (an early attempt at decimalisation, being ), was in everyday use. It was referred to as "two bob", a "two-shilling bit", or a "two-bob bit".

A two-shillings-and-sixpence piece, in use until the introduction of decimal currency, was known as "half a crown" or a "half crown". They were discontinued in 1971 as there was no need for a  New Pence coin.

A five-shilling piece was called a crown or a dollar.

A ten-shilling note was sometimes known as "half a bar". It was first printed in 1914 by the Treasury during World War I to conserve silver. These early Treasury notes (especially the 1st and 2nd Series from 1914 to 1917) were nicknamed "Bradburys", from the prominent stylized signature of Sir John Bradbury, Permanent Secretary to the Treasury (1913–1919).

A pound was called a "nicker" or "quid". The term "quid" is said to originate from the Latin phrase quid pro quo. A pound coin, or sovereign, was called a "sov" or "thick 'un" (because it was thicker than a shilling). A pound note was called a "bar" or "sheet" (from its rectangular shape) or simply a "note" (e.g., "You owe me 50 notes").

The larger denomination notes (£5, £10, £20, £50, £100, £200, £500, and £1,000) printed from the 18th century to 1943 were called "white notes" because they were printed on lightweight white paper with the text in black ink.

In popular culture
The currency of knuts, sickles and galleons in the Harry Potter books is a parody of the £sd system, with 29 knuts to a sickle and 17 sickles to a galleon. It serves as the currency of the Wizarding World, while pounds are still used by Muggles, the non-magical people.

Lysergic acid diethylamide was sometimes called "pounds, shillings and pence" during the 1960s, because of the abbreviation LSD. The English rock group the Pretty Things released a 1966 single titled "£.s.d." that highlighted the double entendre. The Chemical Defence Experimental Establishment called the first field trial with LSD as a chemical weapon "Moneybags" as a pun.

The score of 26 at darts (one dart in each of the top three spaces) was sometimes called "half-a-crown" as late as the 1990s, though this did start to confuse the younger players. 26 is also referred to as "Breakfast", since 2/6 or half a crown was the standard cost for breakfast pre-decimalisation.

See also

 Sterling coinage – the standard circulating coinage of the United Kingdom
 Irish pound – decimalised on Decimal Day, the Irish Pound was the currency of Ireland until 2002
 Decimal time – the representation of the time of day using units which are decimally related

References

External links

 

Currencies of the United Kingdom
Numismatics
Economic history of Ireland